Pseudo-Jerome is the name given to several authors misidentified as, or pseudepigraphically claiming to be, Saint Jerome. A principal writing identified as "Pseudo Jerome" is the ninth-century writing the 'Epistle of Pseudo-Jerome to Paula and Eustochium,' a sermon on the Assumption of Mary.

References 

Christian manuscripts